University College of Northern Denmark were formed under the Danish act on university colleges for higher education, which was adopted by the Danish parliament in 2007. Today, the sector is composed of six university colleges.

Formally, UCN has existed since 3 July, 2007 and is a merger between a number of educational institutions.

For the first year of its existence, UCN comprised the former CVU Nordjylland (Hjørring Teacher College, Aalborg Teacher College, the College of Social Pedagogy and the Skipper Clement college) and Sundheds CVU Nordjylland (the Aalborg School of Nursing and Radiography, Vendsyssel School of Nursing, the Denmark School of Midwifery in Aalborg as well as the School of Physiotherapy and Occupational Therapy). Back then, UCN provided eight bachelor's degree programmes as well as a number of courses and continuing professional education courses in pedagogy and health.

UCN was the first university college to merge with a business academy. This took place on 1 January, 2009 when Nordjyllands Erhvervsakademi (Business Academy Nordjylland) became part of the university college.

On 1 July, 2016, UCN increased its education activities in the city of Thisted when UCN took over the nursing, pedagogy and pedagogy assistant programmes from VIA University College. By then, UCN was already providing the marketing management and financial management programmes in Thisted.

Today, UCN covers all of North Jutland with a range of short-cycle and first cycle degrees in business, education, health, and technology with campuses in the cities of Aalborg, Hjørring and Thisted. All told, UCN provides 28 academy profession and profession-oriented bachelor's degree programmes, one vocational education programme and 11 top-up programmes. UCN has approximately 9,000 students. UCN's continuing professional education programmes and courses are provided by UCN act2learn and UCN Educational Resources Centre (CFU).

UCN is an institution of the UAS type with applied sciences and close contact with the public and private business sector.

Exchange Programmes 
UCN offer exchange programmes within business, social education, health and technology. The exchange programmes have a duration of 1 semester and you can apply for Spring or Fall admission for selected semesters.
Please note that it is not possible to study a full-degree programme as an international student at UCN.

 Architectural Technology and Construction Management
 Computer Science
 Export and Technology Management
 International Hospitality Management
 Marketing Management
 Midwifery
 Nursing
 Occupational Therapy
 Physiotherapy
 Radiography
 Teacher Education

References

External links 
 
 

Colleges in Denmark
Education in Aalborg
Educational institutions established in 2008
Universities in Denmark
Hjørring
2008 establishments in Denmark